Pimprapa Tangprabhaporn is a Thai actress, singer and model. Her nickname is Pim. She was born on 10 October 1992. She was well known as Fasai in Thai drama series, Once Upon A Time in My Heart.

Biography
Pimprapa or Pim was born on 10 October 1992 in Bangkok, Thailand. She has 2 younger sisters(Pair and Ploy). She graduated from Heathfield International School in secondary school, Bromsgrove International School in high school(grade 10) and passed grade 12 equivalent test(ITCSE) to study in the university. Pim graduated Communication Design program (Commde) from Faculty of Architecture at Chulalongkorn university and got the degree certificate, Bachelor of Arts, in 2014.

In 2000, Pim was first on screen, Look Mai Klai Ton, when she was 7 years old and then played many roles on many dramas such as Nueng Nai Suang, Khamin Kub Poon, Sai Lo Hit, Rang Ngao, etc. In 2007, Pim has passed the audition to be a singer in Kamikaze music label which affiliated by RS music company. She was a member of the girl group, Chilli White Choc which was in Lipz Project. After that 2 members of her group, Ink and Best, were quit due to expired contracts so the group was disbanded. However, her career was still continued, Pim was also in one of successful projects, Sevendays, as the Tuesday girl, in 2009.

After the project, in 2010, Kamikaze formed new girl group from the disbanded girls in Lipz project, Pim Min and Jinny, the new group named Swee:D and this group was also popular one. Their song, Sad Scene() was on top on Thai radio charts. Unfortunately, Pim decided to stop to be a singer because of her class times were not enough and her contract were going to expire so she has decided to go back to study in 2012 and graduated from Faculty of Architecture at Chulalongkorn university in 2014. In 2013, Pim was back to be an actress on TV series again in Wiman Maprow, comedy series in channel 7 and now she is an actress under channel 7, too.

Discography

Music

Lipz project

Sevendays

Swee:d

Kamikaze

Ost.

Special song

Music video
2007
 Na Krab Na Krab – Faye Fang Kaew
 MSN^_^ – Faye Fang Kaew
 Pak Dee Khee Ngao Oaw Tae Jai – Mila
 Tam Jai Pak – Knomjean
2008
 Phom Ruk Khun (I Luv U) – Faye Fang Kaew
2009
 Khon Ngao Kao Tum Kan – Nice 2 Meet U
2010
 Mai Ruk Ter(Love You No More) – Waii

Concerts

Filmography

Tv series

Movie

Musical theatre

Presenter
 12 plus
 Lays (Loon Larn)
 Mitzubishi air conditioner
 Party snack with Seven Days
 G-Net 101 mobile phone in concept of Seven Color with Seven Days
 Meiji Paigen
 Mistine with Saran Siriluk
 TRESemme+Dove with Saran Siriluk
 Dina with Araya A.Hargate

MC
 Television 
 202 :

 Online 
 2021 : - On Air YouTube:PimNiyom

Awards and nominations

References

External links
  
  
 

1992 births
Living people
Pimprapa Tangprabhaporn
Pimprapa Tangprabhaporn
Pimprapa Tangprabhaporn
Pimprapa Tangprabhaporn
Thai television personalities
Pimprapa Tangprabhaporn
Pimprapa Tangprabhaporn
Pimprapa Tangprabhaporn